John N. Hendren (1822 — 1898) had been a Virginia attorney and judge who served as the second Treasurer of the Confederate States of America, serving during the last year of the American Civil War.

Hendren was born in Staunton, Virginia. He was the nephew of locally prominent Presbyterian minister John Hendren. He attended The College of William & Mary, studied law, passed his bar exam, and established a prosperous legal practice in Staunton. He married, raised a family, and built a large mansion, "Selma."

Secretary of the Treasury Christopher Memminger resigned his post on July 18, 1864, and was replaced by fellow South Carolinian George Trenholm. However, Edward C. Elmore initially stayed on as Treasurer under Trenholm, but resigned in the autumn. Shortly afterward, Hendren posted his bond on October 10, 1864, and assumed the role of Treasurer. He stayed in his post until the fall of the Confederacy in April 1865.

Following the war, Hendren returned to Staunton and was a judge for Augusta County, Virginia.

Notes

References
 Current, Richard N., Encyclopedia of the Confederacy, Simon & Schuster, 1995. .

External links
"Selma" Residence of Judge John N. Hendren Retrieved 2008-10-27

Confederate States Department of the Treasury officials
Politicians from Staunton, Virginia
Virginia lawyers
People of Virginia in the American Civil War
College of William & Mary alumni
1822 births
1898 deaths